James Wallace "Waddey" Harvey (March 26, 1947 – July 4, 1997) was an American football defensive tackle. He played for the Buffalo Bills from 1969 to 1970. He played college football at Virginia Tech where his accomplishments led to his induction into the Virginia Tech Sports Hall of Fame.

References

1947 births
1997 deaths
Players of American football from Richmond, Virginia
American football defensive tackles
Virginia Tech Hokies football players
Buffalo Bills players